"Oye Cómo Va" is a 1962 cha-cha-chá by Tito Puente, originally released on El Rey Bravo (Tico Records). The song achieved worldwide popularity in 1970, when it was recorded by American rock group Santana for their album Abraxas. This version was released as a single in 1971, reaching number 13 on the Billboard Hot 100, number 11 on the Billboard Easy Listening survey, and number 32 on the R&B chart. The block chord ostinato pattern that repeats throughout the song was most likely borrowed by Puente from Cachao's 1957 mambo "Chanchullo", which was recorded by Puente in 1959.

The song has been praised by critics and inducted into the Latin Grammy Hall of Fame in 2001 and the Grammy Hall of Fame in 2002. Due to its multinational origins—Cuban, Puerto Rican and American—and its many versions by artists from all over the world, "Oye cómo va" has come to represent "the interconnectedness, hybridity and transnationality" of Latin music in the United States.

Original version
"Oye cómo va" was written and recorded by Tito Puente and his orchestra in 1962 for Tico Records. The name of the song is taken from its refrain: "Oye cómo va, mi ritmo..." (Listen how it goes, my rhythm). The song was arranged as a cha-cha-chá with a repeated piano tumbao consisting of block chords and a vocal refrain sung by a chorus, typical of cha-cha-chá. The song's introduction and piano vamp are highly similar to the 1957 mambo "Chanchullo" by Israel "Cachao" López. According to Max Salazar, it is likely that Puente was inspired by Cachao's tune when composing "Oye cómo va", given the clear similarities. In fact, Puente recorded the song in 1959 for his album Mucho cha cha (RCA Victor).

Puente himself recorded "Oye cómo va" live on many occasions, including his 1980 Montreux Jazz Festival appearance with the Latin Percussion Jazz Ensemble.

Santana version

Santana's arrangement is a "driving, cranked-up version" in a new style of Latin rock, adding electric guitar, Hammond B-3 organ, and a rock drum kit to the instrumentation and dropping Puente's brass section. The electric guitar part takes on Puente's flute melody, and the organ provides accompaniment (with organist Gregg Rolie's discreet use of the Leslie effect). There are several guitar solos and an organ solo, all of which are rooted in rock and the blues but also contain licks similar to those of the original arrangement.

Tito Puente, speaking in the intro to his recording of "Oye cómo va" on the album Mambo Birdland, said "Everybody's heard of Santana. Santana! Beautiful Santana! He put our music, Latin rock, around the world, man! And I'd like to thank him publicly 'cause he recorded a tune and he gave me credit as the composer of the tune. So, since that day... all we play... is Santana music!" The version of the song on Mambo Birdland is a Santana-sized version. When interviewed, Puente explained how he was initially outraged by his song being covered by a rock band, until he received his first royalty check.

Santana's version was inducted into the Latin Grammy Hall of Fame in 2001 and the Grammy Hall of Fame in 2002. It was also included in the NPR 100 list, "the most important American musical works of the 20th century". In 2021, it was ranked No. 479 on Rolling Stone'''s "500 Greatest Songs of All Time".

Santana's recording was sampled by 2 Live Crew on the song "Mamolapenga" from their 1990 album Banned in the U.S.A..

Chart performance

Other versions
The song has been covered by various Latin music artists, such as Joe Cuba (1963 and 1970, in a medley with "Aprieta el pollo"), Azúcar Moreno (1990), Gerardo Mejía (1991), Julio Iglesias (1994), Banda M-1 (1994), Fruko y sus Tesos (1995), Celia Cruz (2000), The Conga Kings (2001), Kinky (2004). Japanese singer Chisato Moritaka covered the song on her 1990 album Kokon Tozai. Natalie Cole recorded the song in 2013 on her #1 and Latin Grammy-nominated album Natalie Cole en Español. Jazz versions have been recorded by Bobby Hutcherson (Montara, 1975), Michel Camilo (Thru My Eyes, 1997), New Orleans Nightcrawlers (Live at the Old Point, 2000) and Eliane Elias (Around the City, 2006). The Ventures included it on their New Testament'' album in 1971.

The song has been remixed by DJs as well. Two remixes charted in the United Kingdom. A remix of Tito Puente Jr & The Latin Rhythm's 1996 version of the song reached #36 in the UK charts. A second remix, released in 1997, peaked at #56.

References

1962 songs
1971 singles
Cha-cha-cha
Salsa songs
Santana (band) songs
Julio Iglesias songs
Celia Cruz songs
La India songs
Spanish-language songs
Grammy Hall of Fame Award recipients
Latin Grammy Hall of Fame Award recipients
RCA Records singles